State Road 205 (NM 205) is a  state highway in the US state of New Mexico. NM 205's southern terminus is at County Road 3 (CR 3) southwest of Bennett, and the northern terminus is at NM 128 in Jal.

Major intersections

See also

References

205
Transportation in Lea County, New Mexico